Mother O' Mine is a 1917 American silent drama film directed by Rupert Julian and starring Julian, Ruth Clifford and E. Alyn Warren.

Cast
 Rupert Julian as John Standing
 Ruth Clifford as Catherine Thurston
 E. Alyn Warren as Romeo Bonelli 
 Elsie Jane Wilson as Christine
 Ruby Lafayette as Mrs. Standing

References

Bibliography
James Robert Parish & Michael R. Pitts. Film directors: a guide to their American films. Scarecrow Press, 1974.

External links
 

1917 films
1917 drama films
1910s English-language films
American silent feature films
Silent American drama films
American black-and-white films
Universal Pictures films
Films directed by Rupert Julian
1910s American films